The  is an electric multiple unit (EMU) commuter train type operated by the private railway operator Odakyu Electric Railway in the Tokyo area of Japan. Built between 1987 and 1993, the first train entered service in March 1988.

Formations
, the fleet consists of 196 vehicles, formed as 4-, 6-, 8-, and 10-car sets, with car 1 at the western end.

10-car sets
The six ten-car sets, 1091 to 1096, are formed as follows.

 Cars 3, 5, 8, and 9 are each equipped with one single-arm pantograph.
 Car 2 is designated as a mildly-air-conditioned car.

8-car set
The single eight-car set, 1081, is formed as follows.

 Cars 3, 4, 6, and 7 are each equipped with one single-arm pantograph.
 Car 2 is designated as a mildly-air-conditioned car.

6-car sets 1251 to 1255
The four six-car sets 1251 and 1253 to 1255 are formed as follows.

 Cars 3, 4, and 5 are each equipped with one single-arm pantograph.
 Car 2 is designated as a mildly-air-conditioned car.

6-car sets 1751 to 1756
The six six-car 1500 series sets 1751 to 1756 are formed as follows. These sets have wider side doors.

 On sets 1751 and 1752, cars 3, 4, and 5 are each equipped with one single-arm pantograph, while on sets 1753 to 1756, cars 2, 4, and 5 are each equipped with one single-arm pantograph
 Car 2 is designated as a mildly-air-conditioned car.

4-car sets

The 19 four-car sets, 1051 to 1069 are formed as follows.

 Cars 2 and 3 are each equipped with one single-arm pantograph.

Interior
Passenger accommodation consists of longitudinal bench seating throughout.

History
The first trains were delivered in December 1987, entering revenue service from 22 March 1988. From 2007, the train type was displaced from Tokyo Metro Chiyoda Line services by new 4000 series 10-car sets. Since then, they have been used on surface-level Odakyu Line services, as well as some portions of the Hakone Tozan Line.

Refurbishment
From 2014, 160 out of the operational fleet of 196 1000 series started undergoing a programme of life-extension refurbishment. The refurbishment includes the replacement of the existing traction motors with new 190 kW AC traction motors, silicon carbide inverter traction control, and new air-conditioning units with 8% higher capacity. The interiors were completely refurbished with LED lighting, LCD passenger information displays above the doorways, and new moquette seat covers. The exteriors also received LED headlights and direction indicators.

, two unrefirbushed trainsets remain in operation: a 6-car set and a 4-car set.

References

Electric multiple units of Japan
01000 series
Train-related introductions in 1988
1500 V DC multiple units of Japan
Kawasaki multiple units
Tokyu Car multiple units
Nippon Sharyo multiple units